TAL or Tal may refer to:

Acronym
 Ralph M. Calhoun Memorial Airport (IATA code: TAL), in Tanana, Alaska
 TAL – Transportes Aéreos Ltda, the original name of TAC – Transportes Aéreos Catarinense, a Brazilian airline
 TAL effector, a family of DNA binding proteins with high sequence specificity
 Terai Arc Landscape, a trans-border protected ecosystem of Nepal and India
 The Alberta Library, a not-for-profit library consortium
 This American Life, a radio and television program
 Tokyo Ai-Land Shuttle, a helicopter passenger service in the Izu Islands, Japan
 Tower Australia Life, an insurance company in Australia owned by Dai-ichi Life
 Transalpine Pipeline, a crude oil pipeline
 Transitional Administrative Law of Iraq
 Transoceanic Abort Landing for the Space Shuttle
 Triacetic acid lactone, an organic compound
 Tyrosine ammonia lyase, an enzyme
 Technology Alert List, a list created by the United States government of sensitive subjects when reviewing visa applications

Programming languages
Template Attribute Language
Transaction Application Language, Tandem's system programming language
Typed assembly language

Places
 Tal (Munich), a street in Munich, Germany
 Tal, Madhya Pradesh, India, a town
 Tal, Hormozgan, Iran, a village
 Tal or Tall, Semnan, Iran, a village

Entertainment
 Tal: His Marvelous Adventures with Noom-Zor-Noom, a 1929 fantasy adventure novel by Paul Fenimore Cooper
 A main character from Garth Nix's The Seventh Tower series
 Tal (album), a 1956 album by American jazz guitarist Tal Farlow

People
 Tal (name), a list of people with either the given name or surname
 Tal (singer), Israeli-French pop singer Tal Benizri (born 1989)

Business
 Tal (ISP), a former Icelandic ISP (now a part of 365 (media corporation))
 TAL Education Group, a Chinese holding company that offers after-school education.

Other uses
 Tal language, spoken in Nigeria
 Tal, a traditional Korean mask
 Tal (Rauch), a 1999 painting by Neo Rauch

See also
 Tala (music), also spelled Taal, a term for rhythmic patterns from Indian classical music